Carl E. Schachter (born June 1, 1932) is an American music theorist noted for his expertise in Schenkerian analysis.

Born in Chicago, he attended Austin High School, graduating at age 16. 
Beginning in 1948 he began studies at the Mannes School of Music.  He studied piano with Sara Levee, Isabelle Vengerova and Israel Citkowitz, and conducting with Carl Bamberger.  Most significantly he studied with Felix Salzer, who was later co-author with Schachter of the influential text Counterpoint in Composition. He received a Bachelor of Science from Mannes; an MA from New York University (musicology); and a DM from Mannes College of Music. 

Among Schachter's noted students are Murray Perahia, Richard Goode, Frederica von Stade, Rami Bar-Niv, Myung-whun Chung, and Edward Aldwell (who was co-author with Schachter of another influential text, Harmony and Voice Leading).

Schachter has held visiting professorships at Hunter College, Binghamton University, Harvard University, Mannes College of Music and École Normale Superieure de Jeunes Filles (Paris). He was Professor of Music at Queens College and the CUNY Graduate School from 1972 to 1993, where he held the position of Distinguished Professor of Music, 1993–1996.

Schachter association with the Mannes College of Music began as a student in 1948. After graduation in 1953, Schacter became a member of the Techniques of Music faculty in 1956; Chair of Theory Department, 1958–1962; Dean of Mannes, 1962–1966; and Chair of Techniques of Music Department 1966–1973. He has also served on the faculty of the Juilliard School.

References

  

American music theorists
Juilliard School faculty
Mannes School of Music alumni
New York University alumni
Hunter College faculty
Living people
Harvard University staff
Schenkerian analysis
1932 births